P. G. Vinda is an Indian cinematographer and director who works in the Telugu film industry. He is known for his work on the 2004 black-and-white film, Grahanam, which was directed by Mohan Krishna Indraganti. Other Vinda films include Anumanaspadam, Ashta Chemma, and Vinayakudu. 
He made his directorial debut with the children's movie The Lotus Pond (2011).

Early life and education 
Vinda was born into a Telugu-speaking Hindu farming family in Palem, a village in Mahbubnagar, Telangana. He studied at AP Residential School from Beechupally, located on the banks of the Krishna river, APRDC silver-jubilee degree college Kurnool.

As a child he was also interested in painting. He graduated from the Jawaharlal Nehru Fine Arts University (JNTU) Hyderabad with a degree in fine arts specializing in photography and visual communication. He started his career as an assistant to cinematographer Madhu Ambat for Rajkumar Santoshi's Lajja.

Vinda started his career as a cinematographer after graduating from School of Fine Arts. When everyone hesitated to work with Digital format in its earlier days, Vinda earned a distinction of master of digital format in Telugu cinema.
Vinda has good association with sensible Director Indraganti Mohana Krishna and they worked together in films like Grahanam (2004) Thanikella Bharani in lead, Ashta Chemma (2008) Nani, Swathi and Sreenivas Avasarala debut film, Antaku Mundhu Aa Tarvata (2014) and now they are working on Bandipotu (2015) starring Allari Naresh.

In 2011 he directed the children's movie The Lotus Pond, which was screened at the Banff Mountain Film Festival and the 17th Children's International Film Festival in India.

Vinda set up his production houses Flying Mountain Productions in 2012 and Vinda Productions in 2018 at IMPPA, producing commercials, documentaries and feature films.

Filmography

Director and writer
The Lotus Pond (2010) (English and Telugu)

References

External links
 
 PG Vinda interview on totaltollywood
 Interview on cinegoer.com

Telugu film cinematographers
Living people
1976 births
Cinematographers from Telangana